Probabilistic logic (also probability logic and probabilistic reasoning) involves the use of probability and logic to deal with uncertain situations. Probabilistic logic extends traditional logic truth tables with probabilistic expressions. A difficulty of probabilistic logics is their tendency to multiply the computational complexities of their probabilistic and logical components.  Other difficulties include the possibility of counter-intuitive results, such as in case of belief fusion in Dempster–Shafer theory. Source trust and epistemic uncertainty about the probabilities they provide, such as defined in subjective logic, are additional elements to consider. The need to deal with a broad variety of contexts and issues has led to many different proposals.

Logical background
There are numerous proposals for probabilistic logics. Very roughly, they can be categorized into two different classes: those logics that attempt to make a probabilistic extension to logical entailment, such as Markov logic networks, and those that attempt to address the problems of uncertainty and lack of evidence (evidentiary logics).

That the concept of probability can have different meanings may be understood by noting that, despite the mathematization of probability in the Enlightenment, mathematical probability theory remains, to this very day, entirely unused in criminal courtrooms, when evaluating the "probability" of the guilt of a suspected criminal.

More precisely, in evidentiary logic, there is a need to distinguish the objective truth of a statement from our decision about the truth of that statement, which in turn must be distinguished from our confidence in its truth: thus, a suspect's real guilt is not necessarily the same as the judge's decision on guilt, which in turn is not the same as assigning a numerical probability to the commission of the crime, and deciding whether it is above a numerical threshold of guilt.  The verdict on a single suspect may be guilty or not guilty with some uncertainty, just as the flipping of a coin may be predicted as heads or tails with some uncertainty.  Given a large collection of suspects, a certain percentage may be guilty, just as the probability of flipping "heads" is one-half. However, it is incorrect to take this law of averages with regard to a single criminal (or single coin-flip): the criminal is no more "a little bit guilty" than predicting a single coin flip to be "a little bit heads and a little bit tails": we are merely uncertain as to which it is.  Expressing uncertainty as a numerical probability may be acceptable when making scientific measurements of physical quantities, but it is merely a mathematical model of the uncertainty we perceive in the context of "common sense" reasoning and logic.  Just as in courtroom reasoning, the goal of employing uncertain inference is to gather evidence to strengthen the confidence of a proposition, as opposed to performing some sort of probabilistic entailment.

Historical context
Historically, attempts to quantify probabilistic reasoning date back to antiquity. There was a particularly strong interest starting in the 12th century, with the work of the Scholastics, with the invention of the half-proof (so that two half-proofs are sufficient to prove guilt), the elucidation of moral certainty (sufficient certainty to act upon, but short of absolute certainty), the development of Catholic probabilism (the idea that it is always safe to follow the established rules of doctrine or the opinion of experts, even when they are less probable), the case-based reasoning of casuistry, and the scandal of Laxism (whereby probabilism was used to give support to almost any statement at all, it being possible to find an expert opinion in support of almost any proposition.).

Modern proposals
Below is a list of proposals for probabilistic and evidentiary extensions to classical and predicate logic.

 The term "probabilistic logic" was first used in a paper by Nils Nilsson published in 1986, where the truth values of sentences are probabilities. The proposed semantical generalization induces a probabilistic logical entailment, which reduces to ordinary logical entailment when the probabilities of all sentences are either 0 or 1. This generalization applies to any logical system for which the consistency of a finite set of sentences can be established.
 The central concept in the theory of subjective logic is opinions about some of the propositional variables involved in the given logical sentences. A binomial opinion applies to a single proposition and is represented as a 3-dimensional extension of a single probability value to express probabilistic and epistemic uncertainty about the truth of the proposition. For the computation of derived opinions based on a structure of argument opinions, the theory proposes respective operators for various logical connectives, such as e.g. multiplication (AND), comultiplication (OR), division (UN-AND) and co-division (UN-OR) of opinions, conditional deduction (MP) and abduction (MT)., as well as Bayes' theorem.
 The approximate reasoning formalism proposed by fuzzy logic can be used to obtain a logic in which the models are the probability distributions and the theories are the lower envelopes. In such a logic the question of the consistency of the available information is strictly related with the one of the coherence of partial probabilistic assignment and therefore with Dutch book phenomena.
 Markov logic networks implement a form of uncertain inference based on the maximum entropy principle—the idea that probabilities should be assigned in such a way as to maximize entropy, in analogy with the way that Markov chains assign probabilities to finite state machine transitions.
 Systems such as Pei Wang's Non-Axiomatic Reasoning System (NARS) or Ben Goertzel's Probabilistic Logic Networks (PLN) add an explicit confidence ranking, as well as a probability to atoms and sentences.  The rules of deduction and induction incorporate this uncertainty, thus side-stepping difficulties in purely Bayesian approaches to logic (including Markov logic), while also avoiding the paradoxes of Dempster–Shafer theory.  The implementation of PLN attempts to use and generalize algorithms from logic programming, subject to these extensions.
 In the field of probabilistic argumentation, various formal frameworks have been put forward. The framework of "probabilistic labellings", for example, refers to probability spaces where a sample space is a set of labellings of argumentation graphs. In the framework of "probabilistic argumentation systems" probabilities are not directly attached to arguments or logical sentences. Instead it is assumed that a particular subset  of the variables  involved in the sentences defines a probability space over the corresponding sub-σ-algebra. Degrees of support can be regarded as non-additive probabilities of provability, which generalizes the concepts of ordinary logical entailment (for ) and classical posterior probabilities (for ). Mathematically, this view is compatible with the Dempster–Shafer theory.
 The theory of evidential reasoning also defines non-additive probabilities of probability (or epistemic probabilities) as a general notion for both logical entailment (provability) and probability. The idea is to augment standard propositional logic by considering an epistemic operator K that represents the state of knowledge that a rational agent has about the world. Probabilities are then defined over the resulting epistemic universe Kp of all propositional sentences p, and it is argued that this is the best information available to an analyst. From this view, Dempster–Shafer theory appears to be a generalized form of probabilistic reasoning.

See also

 Statistical relational learning
 Bayesian inference, Bayesian networks, Bayesian probability
 Cox's theorem
 Dempster–Shafer theory
 Fréchet inequalities
 Fuzzy logic
 Imprecise probability
 Logic, Deductive logic, Non-monotonic logic
 Possibility theory
 Probabilism, Half-proof, Scholasticism
 Probabilistic database
 Probabilistic soft logic
 Probability, Probability theory
 Probabilistic argumentation
 Probabilistic proof
 Subjective logic
 Uncertain inference
 Upper and lower probabilities

References

Further reading
 Adams, E. W., 1998. A Primer of Probability Logic. CSLI Publications (Univ. of Chicago Press).
 Bacchus, F., 1990. "Representing and reasoning with Probabilistic Knowledge. A Logical Approach to Probabilities". The MIT Press.
 Carnap, R., 1950. Logical Foundations of Probability. University of Chicago Press.
 Chuaqui, R., 1991. Truth, Possibility and Probability: New Logical Foundations of Probability and Statistical Inference. Number 166 in Mathematics Studies. North-Holland.
 Haenni, H., Romeyn, JW, Wheeler, G., and Williamson, J. 2011. Probabilistic Logics and Probabilistic Networks, Springer.
 Hájek, A., 2001, "Probability, Logic, and Probability Logic," in Goble, Lou, ed., The Blackwell Guide to Philosophical Logic, Blackwell.
 Jaynes, E., ~1998, "Probability Theory: The Logic of Science", pdf and Cambridge University Press 2003.
 Kyburg, H. E., 1970. Probability and Inductive Logic Macmillan.
 Kyburg, H. E., 1974. The Logical Foundations of Statistical Inference, Dordrecht: Reidel.
 Kyburg, H. E. & C. M. Teng, 2001. Uncertain Inference, Cambridge: Cambridge University Press.
 Romeiyn, J. W., 2005. Bayesian Inductive Logic. PhD thesis, Faculty of Philosophy, University of Groningen, Netherlands. 
 Williamson, J., 2002, "Probability Logic," in D. Gabbay, R. Johnson, H. J. Ohlbach, and J. Woods, eds., Handbook of the Logic of Argument and Inference: the Turn Toward the Practical. Elsevier: 397–424.

External links 
 Progicnet: Probabilistic Logic And Probabilistic Networks
 Subjective logic demonstrations
 The Society for Imprecise Probability

Probabilistic arguments
Non-classical logic
Formal epistemology